Julio Valdeón Baruque (Olmedo, Province of Valladolid, 21 July 1936 - Valladolid, 21 June 2009) was a historian of Spain.

Life and career
He studied at the University of Valladolid, earning a degree in History, and subsequently earning a PhD. Enter 1967 and 1971 was associated professor Medieval History of Universidad Complutense de Madrid. He became a professor in that subject, serving in 1971 and 1973 in the University of Seville. From 1973 he was professor of Medieval History at the University of Valladolid. Enter 1981 and 1984 was dean of the Faculty of Arts of the University and later served as director of its Department of Medieval History. Under his tutelage was formed a generation of prestigious medievalists, including María Isabel del Val, Juan Carlos Martín Cea, Asunción Esteban Recio, Ángel Martínez Casado and Juan Antonio Bonachía Hernando.

He was a founding member and chairman of the editorial Ambito, a member of the editorial board of Spanish newspaper El Mundo century, and a member of the advisory board of the journal Historia16.

In 1994, he was curator of the exhibition El testamento de Adán. In July 2002,he  was appointed director of the Institute of History of Simancas. On November 16, 2001, he was elected a full member of the Real Academia de la Historia, to fill the vacancy left by Pedro Lain Entralgo, entering the same in June 2002.

He was one of the largest and most prestigious specialists from Spain in the late medieval period in the Crown of Castile.

He is father of the novelist Julio Valdeón Blanco.

He died in Valladolid on 21 June 2009.

Awards 
In February 2002 he received the honor of Castile and León Award for Social Sciences and Humanities "in recognition of research work on the medieval past, and permanent teachers and generous disposition".

In 2004 he received the National History Award of Spain for his work Alfonso X: la forja de la España moderna.

Works 
() La muerte y el más allá: Edad Media n.º 6 Universidad de Valladolid. Secretariado de Publicaciones e Intercambio Editorial, 2004.
() La Alta Edad MediaGrupo Anaya, S.A., 2003.
() La España medieval Actas, S.L., 2003.
() Alfonso X: la forja de la España moderna Ediciones Temas de Hoy, S.A., 2003.
() El retorno de la biografía : Edad Media nº 5 Universidad de Valladolid. Secretariado de Publicaciones e Intercambio Editorial, 2002.
() Contestación social y mundo campesino: edad media Universidad de Valladolid. Secretariado de Publicaciones e Intercambio Editorial, 2002.
() Historia de las Españas medievales (Et al.) Editorial Crítica, 2002.
() Abderramán III y el Califato de Córdoba Nuevas Ediciones de Bolsillo, 2002.
() Pedro I, el Cruel y Enrique de Trastamara Aguilar, S.A. de Ediciones-Grupo Santillana, 2002.
() España y el "Sacro Imperio": procesos de cambios, influencias y acciones recíprocas en la época de la "europeización" (siglos XI-XIII) Universidad de Valladolid. Secretariado de Publicaciones e Intercambio Editorial, 2002.
() Los trastámaras Ediciones Temas de Hoy, S.A., 2001.
() Abderramán III y el Califato de Córdoba Editorial Debate, 2001.
() Judíos y conversos en la Castilla medieval Universidad de Valladolid. Secretariado de Publicaciones e Intercambio Editorial, 2000.
() El Camino de Santiago en coche (Et al.) Anaya-Touring Club, 1999.
() La Baja Edad Media Grupo Anaya, S.A., 1998.
() El Camino de Santiago (Et al.) Anaya-Touring Club, 1998.
() Enrique II Diputación Provincial de Palencia, 1996.
() La apertura de Castilla al Atlántico : de Alfonso X a los Reyes Católicos Historia 16. Historia Viva, 1995. [Parte de obra completa: T.10]
() Judíos, sefarditas, conversos: la expulsión de 1492 y sus consecuencias (Et al.) Ámbito Ediciones, S.A., 1995.
() Historia de Castilla y León Ámbito Ediciones, S.A., 1993.
() El feudalismo Historia 16. Historia Viva, 1992.
() Edad Media (Et al.) Ediciones Universitarias Nájera, 1990.
() Lugares de celebración de Cortes de Castilla y León Castilla y León. Cortes, 1990.
() La alta edad media Ediciones Generales Anaya, S.A., 1988.
() La baja edad media Ediciones Generales Anaya, S.A., 1988.
() En defensa de la historia Ámbito Ediciones, S.A., 1988.
() Plenitud del Medievo (Et al.) S.A. de Promoción y Ediciones, 1986. [Parte de obra completa: T.12]
() Declive de de la Edad Media S.A. de Promoción y Ediciones, 1986. [Parte de obra completa: T.13]
() Gran Historia Universal. 13. Declive de la Edad Media (Et al.) Ediciones Universitarias Nájera, 1986.
() La Gran Historia Universal. 11. Principios de la Edad Media (Et al.) Ediciones Universitarias Nájera, 1986.
() La Gran Historia Universal. 12. Plenitud del medievo (Et al.) Ediciones Universitarias Nájera, 1986.
() Alfonso X el Sabio Castilla y León. Consejería de Educación y Cultura, 1986.
() Conflictos sociales en el reino de Castilla en los siglos XIV y XV Siglo XXI de España Editores, S.A., 1986.
() Historia de Castilla y León. 5: Crisis y recuperación: s. XIV-XV Ámbito Ediciones, S.A., 1986.
() La época del auge. (ss. XIV-XVI) (Et al.) Ámbito Ediciones, S.A., 1986.
() Historia de Castilla y León Ámbito Ediciones, S.A., 1985.
() Crisis y recuperación (siglos XIV-XV) Ámbito Ediciones, S.A., 1985. [Parte de obra completa: T.5]
() Aproximación histórica a Castilla y León Ámbito Ediciones, S.A., 1985.
() Historia general de la Baja Edad Media Ediciones Universitarias Nájera, 1984.
() Burgos en la Edad Media (Et al.) Castilla y León. Consejería de Educación y Cultura, 1983.
() Iniciación a la historia de Castilla y León (Et al.) Nuestra Cultura Editorial, 1982.
() Iniciación a la historia de Castilla-León Colegio Oficial de Doctores y Licenciados en Filosofía y Letras y en Ciencias de Burgos, 1980.
() Historia general de la Edad Media (Siglos XI al XV) Mayfe, S.A., 1971.
() Los judíos de Castilla y la revolución Trastámara Consejo Superior de Investigaciones Científicas, 1968.
() El Reino de Castilla en la Edad Media International Book Creation, 1968.
() Feudalismo y consolidación de los pueblos hispánicos (siglos XI-XV) (Et al.) Editorial Labor, S.A. [Parte de obra completa: T.4]
() La Baja Edad Media peninsular, siglos XIII al XV (Et al.) Espasa-Calpe, S.A. [Parte de obra completa: T.12]
() Las raíces medievales de Castilla y León'' Ámbito Edicionsa, S.A., 2004.

References

External links 
Bibliography of Julio Valdeón Baruque in Dialnet (in Spanish)
Necrology of Julio Valdeón Baruque in elmundo.es (in Spanish)

University of Valladolid alumni
People from the Province of Valladolid
Spanish male writers
1936 births
2009 deaths